Virbia pomponia is a moth in the family Erebidae first described by Herbert Druce in 1889. It is found in Mexico.

References

pomponia
Moths described in 1889